MoIP, or mobile communications over internet protocol, is the mobilization of peer-to-peer communications including chat and talk using internet protocol via standard mobile communications applications including 3G, GPRS, Wi-Fi as well as Wimax. Unlike mobile VoIP, MoIP is not a VoIP program made accessible from mobile phones or a switchboard application using VoIP in the background. It is rather a native mobile application on users’ handsets and used to conduct talk and chat over the internet connection as its primary channel.

How MoIP (mobile) works 
MoIP applications typically work without any proprietary hardware, are enhanced with real-time contact availability (presence) and save the users money by utilizing free Wi-Fi internet access or fixed internet data plans instead of GSM (talk) minutes. They are completely mobile-centric, designed and optimized specifically for mobile-handsets environment rather than the PC.

Alternate definition 
MoIP is also sometimes used to refer to:
 Mobile VoIP
 Modem over IP or Modem over VoIP
 Media over Internet Protocol
 Meetings Over IP
 Messaging Over Internet Protocol
 Missile On Internal Power
 MPEG over IP

References

External links
ZDNet: Mobile VoIP means business
White paper: V.150 Modem over IP

Voice over IP
Wireless networking